The Sula skink (Eugongylus sulaensis) is a species of lizard in the family Scincidae. It is found in Indonesia.

References

Eugongylus
Reptiles described in 1927
Reptiles of Indonesia
Endemic fauna of Indonesia
Taxa named by Felix Kopstein